Hippocampus montebelloensis, or the Montebello seahorse is a synonym of Hippocampus zebra, Whitley, 1964. It is known from Montebello Islands and Exmouth Gulf in Western Australia.

References 

montebelloensis
Fish described in 2001